Istochny is a rural locality (a settlement) in Moskvitinsky Selsoviet of Svobodnensky District, Amur Oblast, Russia. The population was 70 as of 2018. There are 4 streets.

Geography 
Istochny is located on the bank of the Istok Lake, 40 km south of Svobodny (the district's administrative centre) by road. Moskvitino is the nearest rural locality.

References 

Rural localities in Svobodnensky District